The Gulfstream G650 is a large business jet produced by Gulfstream Aerospace. The model is designated Gulfstream GVI in its type certificate, and may be configured to carry from 11 to 18 passengers. Gulfstream began the G650 program in 2005 and revealed it to the public in 2008. The G650 was formerly the company's largest and fastest business jet with a top speed of Mach 0.925, having been surpassed by the larger G700.

The aircraft project was named the 2014 winner of the Collier Trophy, for having "strengthened business aviation through significant technological advancements in aircraft performance, cabin comfort, and safety." The G650ER is an extended-range version of the G650 adding about 500 nautical miles of range.
The 300th was delivered in April 2018, just over five years since introduction in December 2012. The 400th was delivered in December 2019, seven years after the type's introduction. The 500th was delivered by Gulfstream's Appleton completions facility in September 2022.

Development 
The Gulfstream G650 was formally launched as an internal company project in May 2005, and publicly unveiled on March 13, 2008. At the public announcement occasion, company executives stated the new model would become Gulfstream's largest, fastest and most expensive business jet on entry to the market.

The wing design was completed in 2006. A total of 1,400 hours of wind tunnel testing was completed by 2008.

The G650 taxied under its own power for the first time on September 26, 2009. A public rollout ceremony was held on September 29, 2009. The G650 had its maiden flight on November 25, 2009.

Flight testing for the maximum operating speed of Mach 0.925 was announced as completed on May 4, 2010. Gulfstream reported on August 26, 2010 that the G650 hit a maximum speed of Mach 0.995 during a dive as part of its 1,800-hour flight test program. In April 2011, a G650 crashed shortly after lift off. The cause was determined to be related to the speeds carried out for the single engine takeoff run. The G650 test aircraft were grounded until May 28, 2011, when the remaining test aircraft were allowed to return to flight testing.

On September 7, 2012, the G650 received its type certificate from the US Federal Aviation Administration (FAA). Its first delivery was to an American customer, Preston Henn, on December 27, 2012.

The G650 had a nominal list price of $64.5 million in 2013, but there was a three-year waiting list. Some aircraft produced for delivery in 2013 sold for more than $70 million to buyers that wanted to take immediate delivery.

After rising to $71-73 million in 2014, initial enthusiasm dissipated and the value of pre-owned G650s stabilized at $50 million after the competing Bombardier Global 7500 was certified in 2018.

On May 18, 2014, Gulfstream announced at the annual European Business Aviation Association exhibition, that it had developed an extended range version called the G650ER. The G650ER is capable of flying  at Mach 0.85, due to its  increase in fuel capacity. The extra fuel is housed in existing space inside the G650's wings and aircraft already built may be quickly upgraded to the ER version. The G650ER received its certification in October 2014 and began deliveries in late 2014. The G650ER attempted two world records from New York to Beijing to Savannah in February 2015. The same year, a G650ER set a new record for the longest non-stop flight by a purpose-built business jet, flying  from Singapore to Las Vegas with four passengers and crew. The record was surpassed by a Bombardier Global 7500 in March 2019, before the G650ER retook the record in April 2019 by flying 8,379 nmi (15,518 km) from Singapore to Tucson.

Also in May 2014, Gulfstream confirmed that the G650 would be offered to the United States Air Force for its program to replace the E-8C JSTARS air-to-ground surveillance and targeting aircraft. However, during the fiscal 2019 budget rollout briefing it was announced that the Air Force will not move forward with an E-8C replacement aircraft. Funding for the JSTARS recapitalization program will instead be diverted to pay for development of an advanced battle management system.

In September 2018, Gulfstream was conducting testing at London City Airport to certify the aircraft to perform steep approaches. In 2022, its equipped price was $68.5M for the G650, and $70.5M for the G650ER.

G700 

On the eve of the October 2019 NBAA Convention & Exhibition in Las Vegas, Gulfstream announced its new flagship, the G700, showing a video of the aircraft taxiing under its own power in Savannah.
It should fly 7,500 nmi/13,890 km at Mach 0.85 or 6,400 nmi/11,853 km at Mach 0.90.
Its longer cabin can accommodate up to five areas and has 20 windows.
It is powered by Rolls-Royce Pearl 700 engines and has new winglets.
Customer deliveries should start in 2022.
The $75 million jet is a  stretch of the G650. The aircraft completed its first flight on February 14, 2020.

The G700 should share its fly-by-wire cockpit with the G500/G600: active control sidesticks and Honeywell Primus Epic flight deck with synthetic and enhanced vision systems for a common type rating.
The jet is 110 ft (33.5 m) long, about  longer than the G650ER and about  shorter than the competing Bombardier Global 7500.
It should carry 19 seated passengers or sleep 10.
It will have a MTOW of 107,600 lb (48,800 kg) and the 18,250 lbf (81.2 kN) turbofans should burn 2-3% less fuel than the G650's R-R BR725s.

It has the same  wing with its 33° wingsweep but the more outboard canted winglets are  wider.
The Pearl 700 turbofan is an improved version of the BR725, with one more low-pressure turbine stage, an overall pressure ratio over 50:1, and a bypass ratio higher than 6.5:1 for a 3-5% better thrust specific fuel consumption.

In 2022, its equipped price was $78M.

G800 

On October 4, 2021, Gulfstream unveiled in Savannah the 8,000 nmi (14,800 km) range Gulfstream G800, with the G700 wing and Pearl 700 engines, offering four living areas and 16 windows, with deliveries from 2023.

Priced at $72.5 million, the G800 has a G650-size cabin, 10 ft shorter than the G700's and with two fewer windows. The G800 first flew on June 28, 2022.

Design

It can be equipped with a full kitchen and bar as well as a variety of entertainment features including satellite telephones and wireless Internet.

To better use the main cabin space, Gulfstream designers rejected the usual circular fuselage cross-section in favor of an oval which uses a flatter lower portion. The fuselage and wing are constructed mostly of metal while composite materials are used for the empennage, winglets, rear pressure bulkhead, engine cowlings, cabin floor structure and many fairings. Panels are bonded rather than riveted, reducing parts count compared to the G550.

The G650 wing has a sweep of 36 degrees which is greater than wings on previous Gulfstream aircraft like the G550 with a sweep of 27 degrees. It does not use leading-edge high-lift devices, and tracks for rear-mounted flaps are completely enclosed within the airfoil contour. The wing's leading edge is a continuously changing curve, and the airfoil varies continuously from root to tip. The aircraft also incorporates winglets.

The aircraft controls are completely fly-by-wire, with no mechanical control between pilot and flight surfaces. The surfaces are moved by dual hydraulic systems. The G650 shares its yokes and column with the G550 in an effort to receive a common type rating. While most newer airliners now employ fly-by-wire technology, the G650 was only the second fly-by-wire business jet, after the Dassault Falcon 7X and before the Embraer Legacy 500.

The G700's flight deck is upgraded to the Symmetry flight deck from the G500/G600.

Variants

G650
 Initial production version

Fuel capacity of the wet wings is increased by a modification to the fuel system, through a service bulletin; the modification is available as a $2 million retrofit for existing G650 aircraft. The list price for new a G650ER aircraft was $66.5 million in 2014.

 G700
 Announced in October 2019, the aircraft is stretched by 10 ft 1 in ( m) for a longer cabin with five areas and ten windows per side, up from eight. The engines are 2–3% more efficient  Rolls-Royce Pearl 700 turbofans. The aircraft has a  heavier MTOW than the G650ER for the same  range.

 G800
 Announced in October 2021, the aircraft is slated to replace the G650.

Incidents and accidents
On April 2, 2011, the second G650 test aircraft crashed during takeoff from the Roswell International Air Center, New Mexico, killing the four Gulfstream employees on board (two pilots and two test engineers). The aircraft was conducting a takeoff-performance test during which an engine failure was simulated by reducing the right engine's thrust to idle. The G650 became airborne briefly at a high angle of attack before its right wingtip hit the runway; then it slid on the ground, struck a concrete berm, and caught fire.

The National Transportation Safety Board (NTSB) determined the probable cause of the crash was an aerodynamic stall of the aircraft, due to a failure to properly develop and validate takeoff speeds involving persistent and increasingly aggressive attempts to achieve a V2 speed that was too low. It found that Gulfstream's investigation of the two previous uncommanded roll events was inadequate. The NTSB accused Gulfstream of withholding information, which the company denied. The NTSB also objected to Gulfstream's use of legal counsel during the investigation.

Specifications

See also

References

External links

 
 
 
 
 
 

G650
2000s United States business aircraft
Twinjets
T-tail aircraft
Aircraft first flown in 2009